

References

Italy
France